is a platform shooter video game developed and published by Nintendo. It is the third installment in the Donkey Kong series and it was released for arcades worldwide in 1983 and the Family Computer in 1984, then later released in North America for the Nintendo Entertainment System in 1986. The gameplay departs from previous Donkey Kong games, being primarily a shooter game, and starring an exterminator named Stanley instead of Mario.

It was re-released on the Wii Virtual Console in North America on July 14, 2008, and in Europe on January 9, 2009. It was re-released on Nintendo Switch through Nintendo Switch Online.

Gameplay 

Donkey Kong hangs from vines at the center of the screen, and the player-controlled Stanley the exterminator runs and jumps on platforms beneath him. Stanley can fire bug spray at both Donkey Kong and insects flying around the levels. A level is completed by continually using his sprayer on Donkey Kong, forcing him to the top of the screen, or by killing all of the bugs. A Super Sprayer can on the vines falls down when Donkey Kong is sprayed past it. The Super Sprayer only lasts for a limited amount of time, but it pushes Donkey Kong upward at a much faster rate, making it easier to complete the level. It only spawns at the start of each life.

The insects consist of Buzzbees, queen Beespies (which shatter into deadly pieces when destroyed), Creepy inchworms, Attacker bees, Kabutomushi beetles, and Butterflies. Some of the flying insects attempt to pick up the flowers at the bottom of the screen and carry them away. Lost flowers decrease the bonus at the end of the round.

There are three levels which repeat in a fixed sequence. An extra life is given at 50,000 points, and then the game goes to "survival of the fittest" mode thereafter.

Plot 
Stanley is a bugman. Donkey Kong has taken refuge in his greenhouse and it is now up to Stanley to stop the ape from stirring up any more insects that will soon destroy his flowers. Stanley saves the flowers by spraying bug spray on Donkey Kong.

Reception 
The game was moderately successful in Japan, where Game Machine listed Donkey Kong 3 on their December 1, 1983, issue as being the fourth most-successful new table arcade unit of the month. Despite this, it was a commercial failure in North America, particularly due to the wake of the video game crash of 1983.

Reviews for the arcade game were generally positive. Gene Lewin of Play Meter magazine rated it 8 out of 10. Computer and Video Games said that the game's "fast action and superior sound effects" made Donkey Kong 3 a "sure hit" in arcades.

Retrospectively, reception has been divisive, with criticism aimed at its departure of its predecessors and the lack of Mario. IGN gave the Virtual Console version a 6.0 out of 10, describing it as a "radical departure" from the previous Donkey Kong games, calling it "repetitive".

Legacy 

A VS. series Game & Watch version of the arcade game has different gameplay. In this version, player one controls Stanley the Bugman and computer player (or player two) controls Donkey Kong in a duel against each other using exterminating spray cans to move the bees to the other side of them to make the bees sting their opponents. Players can only hold up to three amounts of spraying liquid in their spray cans. On one player mode, the higher player one as Stanley scores, the faster the spraying liquid on the side of computer player as Donkey Kong drops. A version of this game was included in Game & Watch Gallery 4 for the Game Boy Advance, but featuring Mario in place of Stanley and a Boo and a Fireball in place of the bees.

The NES version of Donkey Kong 3 was released on the Wii Virtual Console, 3DS Virtual Console and Wii U Virtual Console, whilst the arcade version was released on the Nintendo Switch eShop as part of Hamster's Arcade Archives series.

The current world record is held by George Riley (USA) at 3,538,000 points (2011).

Semi-sequel 
In 1984, Hudson Soft developed a semi-sequel for the Japanese-only NEC PC-8801, NEC PC-6601, and Sharp X1 personal computers titled  A version for the FM-7 was also planned, but was never released. This game is significantly different from the original. While the object to shoot Donkey Kong up in the air remains, it has 20 outdoor backgrounds such as a bridge, Planet Saturn, a desert, a pyramid, and a highway. Stanley can only move from left to right and is no longer able to jump.

For decades, Donkey Kong 3: The Great Counterattack was inaccessible outside of Japan. In December 2017, a copy of the Sharp X1 version was bought at a Yahoo! Auctions online auction. Two months later, it was made available via emulation. The PC-8801 version was subsequently uncovered in January 2019.

Notes

References

External links 
 

1983 video games
Arcade video games
3
Nintendo e-Reader games
Game & Watch games
NEC PC-6001 games
NEC PC-8801 games
Nintendo arcade games
Nintendo Entertainment System games
Nintendo Switch games
Nintendo Research & Development 1 games
Sharp X1 games
Video game sequels
Video games about insects
Video games about plants
Video games scored by Hirokazu Tanaka
Video games developed in Japan
Video games directed by Shigeru Miyamoto
Virtual Console games
Virtual Console games for Wii U
Nintendo Switch Online games
Multiplayer and single-player video games
Hamster Corporation games